Gholam Ali Mansoori (born in 1943), G. Ali Mansoori also known as "GA Mansoori" is an Iranian-American scientist known for his research within energy, nanotechnology and thermodynamics. He is a professor at the Departments of Bioengineering, Chemical Engineering and also Physics at University of Illinois at Chicago.

Life and education 
Mansoori completed his PhD at the University of Oklahoma in 1969 with a dissertation on "A Variational Approach to the Equilibrium Thermodynamic Properties of Simple Liquids and Phase Transitions". Mansoori did post-doctoral work at Rice University.

Career 
Mansoori contributed to over 550 publications including ten books, some of which became text-book references in thermodynamics and nanotechnology. The most cited work he has co-authored is Equilibrium thermodynamic properties of the mixture of hard spheres in The Journal of Chemical Physics in 1971 with more than 2000 citations as of February 2019.

Books
A list of Mansoori's books is:

Mansoori, G.A. and Enayati N., Agyarko L. B. (2015). Energy: Sources, Utilization, Legislation, Sustainability, Illinois as Model State. World Scientific
Mansoori, G.A. (2015) Principles of Nanotechnology, Molecular-Based Study of Condensed Matter in Small Systems. World Scientific
Mansoori, G.A., Barros de Araujo Patricia Lopes, Silvano de Araujo,Elmo (2012) Diamondoid Molecules: With Applications in Biomedicine, Materials Science, Nanotechnology & Petroleum Science. 
Mansoori, G.A. and Haile, J.M. (1983). Molecular-based Study of Fluids (ch. 1: Molecular Study of Fluids: A Historical Survey, pgs. 1-28). 
Mansoori, G.A. and Chom, Larry G. (1988). Advances in Thermodynamics, Vol. I: C7+ Fraction Characterization. New York: Taylor & Francis Pub. Co., 
Mansoori, G.A. and Matteoli, E. (1990). Advances in Thermodynamics, Vol. II: Fluctuation Theory of Mixtures. Taylor & Francis.
Mansoori, G.A., Sieniutycz, S. and Salamon, P. (1990). Advances in Thermodynamics, Vol. III: Nonequilibrium Theory and Extremum Principles. Taylor & Francis.
Mansoori, G.A. and Hoffman, E.J. (1991). Advances in Thermodynamics, Vol. V: Analytic Thermodynamics. Taylor & Francis.
Mansoori, G.A., Sieniutycz, S. and Salamon, P. (1992). Advances in Thermodynamics, Vol. VI: Diffusion and rate Processes. Taylor & Francis.
Mansoori, G.A., Sieniutycz, S. and Salamon, P. (1992). Advances in Thermodynamics, Vol. VII: Extended Thermodynamic Systems. Taylor & Francis.

References

External links
 Professor's Mansoori webpage on UIC

1943 births
Living people
University of Illinois Chicago faculty
Iranian expatriate academics
Academics from Chicago
University of Oklahoma alumni
Rice University alumni
Thermodynamicists
American nanotechnologists